Dimitrios Hatzopoulos (born 17 April 1967) is a retired Greek long jumper.

He finished tenth at the 1986 World Junior Championships, eighth at the 1987 European Indoor Championships, seventh at the 1987 World Indoor Championships. He also competed at the 1987 World Championships (no mark), the 1991 World Indoor Championships, the 1994 European Championships, the 1997 World Indoor Championships, the 1997 World Championships (no mark) and the 1998 European Championships without reaching the final.

Regionally he won the 1987 Mediterranean Games, won the Balkan Championships in 1994 and took the bronze medal at the 1997 Mediterranean Games. However, he never became Greek champion, owing to the dominance of Kostas Koukodimos and Spyros Vasdekis.

His personal best jump was 8.07 metres, achieved in June 1994 in Athens. His personal best indoor was 7.99 metres.

References

1967 births
Living people
Greek male long jumpers
World Athletics Championships athletes for Greece
Mediterranean Games gold medalists for Greece
Mediterranean Games bronze medalists for Greece
Athletes (track and field) at the 1987 Mediterranean Games
Athletes (track and field) at the 1997 Mediterranean Games
Mediterranean Games medalists in athletics